The following lists events that happened during the year 2006 in Bosnia and Herzegovina.

Incumbents
Presidency:
Sulejman Tihić (until November 6), Haris Silajdžić (starting November 6)
Ivo Miro Jović (until November 6), Željko Komšić (starting November 6)
Borislav Paravac (until November 6), Nebojša Radmanović (starting November 6)
Prime Minister: Adnan Terzić

Events

February
 February 8 - Muslims in Sarajevo organized a protest against the  Muhammad cartoons. They delivered a letter demanding an apology for the publication of the cartoons to staff at the Danish, Norwegian and French embassies. The flags of Norway, Denmark and Croatia were burnt.

October
 October 1 - 2006 Bosnian general election took place.

References

 
Years of the 21st century in Bosnia and Herzegovina
2000s in Bosnia and Herzegovina
Bosnia and Herzegovina
Bosnia and Herzegovina